Superdawg is a drive-in hot dog stand with carhop service. It is located in the Norwood Park neighborhood of Chicago, at the intersection of Milwaukee, Devon, and Nagle Avenues. Superdawg has the distinction of being one of the few original drive-in restaurants left in the United States. Its methods have been the same since it opened in 1948.  A second, similar location on Milwaukee Avenue in Wheeling, Illinois opened in 2010.

Superdawg was featured on the Food Network's television programs Unwrapped and Emeril Live, and on the PBS television programs Check, Please! and A Hot Dog Program. It has been visited by many critics and food aficionados. It is listed in the books 1,000 Places to See Before You Die and Hot Dog Chicago: A Native's Dining Guide.

History

Superdawg was opened in May 1948 by Maurie and Flaurie Berman, and it is still owned and operated by their family. Although the restaurant has undergone some expansion and remodeling, the landmark figures of anthropomorphic hot dogs "Maurie and Flaurie" on the roof date from the beginning.

In 2003, a Superdawg location opened in Midway Airport's B concourse. It closed in 2010 when another Superdawg restaurant opened on Milwaukee Avenue in Wheeling, Illinois.

Superdawg has succeeded in asking a number of restaurants to cease using similar names, but in 2009 successfully sued a New York City hot dog eatery named Superdog when it refused to comply. The Superdawg trademark was registered in 1984.

In 2014, Superdawg collaborated with Lake Effect Brewing Company, a Chicago craft brewery, to create a lager-style beer called Super Bier.

Maurie Berman died on May 17, 2015. His wife Flaurie died May 1, 2018.

In June 2015, the Unicode Consortium added a hot dog to the list of officially recognized emoji.  In September 2015, Apple made the symbol available on its phones and computers with the release of the iOS 9 operating system.  Superdawg was a leader in the effort to establish the hot dog emoji.

Carhop service

The restaurant retains a 1950s style of ordering food. Customers pull their car up to one of the carports and order through a retro-looking metallic speaker box. Each cashier responds to the customer's call through the speaker box with the greeting, "Hiya, thanks for stopping. May I take your order now?" The orders are delivered to the car window by a carhop with a tray that hooks on to the half-open car window. When finished eating, the customer flips a switch on the box and a carhop comes to take the tray back. Many of the carhops have been there for years and have a loyal base of customers.  There is also a walkup window and a small seating area inside the restaurant. The Wheeling location has a much larger indoor seating area.

The food

All of the sandwiches come with crinkle-cut french fries inside a box that helps retain its heat.  Every Superdawg comes with a signature pickled green tomato, one of Superdawg's distinctions from the classic Chicago-style hot dog, along with its spicier-than-usual wiener. They care about the distinction between a regular red hot as it says on their menu, "not a red hot- not a frankfurter - not a wiener - but our exclusive... Superdawg." They also sell double-cheeseburgers called "Whoopercheesies". Superdawg is also known to never put ketchup on any of their hot dogs. If customers ask for ketchup, it's provided on the side.

See also 

 Chicago-style hot dog
 List of drive-in restaurants

References

External links
 

Hot dog restaurants in the United States
Novelty buildings in Illinois
Restaurants in Chicago
Drive-in restaurants
Restaurants established in 1948
1948 establishments in Illinois